The 2009–10 Austrian Football Bundesliga was the 98th season of top-tier football in Austria. The competition is officially called tipp3-Bundesliga powered by T-Mobile, named after the Austrian betting company tipp3 and the Austrian branch of German mobile phone company T-Mobile. The season began on the weekend of 18 July 2009 and ended on 13 May 2010. RB Salzburg claimed the championship on the last matchday, their second consecutive title.

Team changes from last season
SC Rheindorf Altach were relegated after finishing the 2008–09 season in 10th and last place. They were replaced by First League champions SC Wiener Neustadt.

Overview

Stadia and locations

League table

Results
Teams played each other four times in the league. In the first half of the season each team played every other team twice (home and away), and then did the same in the second half of the season.

First half of season

Second half of season

Top goalscorers
Including matches played on 13 May 2010; Source:Austrian Bundesliga

Top scorers

See also
 2009–10 Austrian Cup
 2009–10 Austrian Football First League

References

External links
 Bundesliga website 
 oefb.at  
 soccerway.com

Austrian Football Bundesliga seasons
Austria
1